Orpen is an Anglo-Norman toponymic surname deriving from "Erpen" (Normandy, France). It may refer to:

Abraham Orpen (1854–1937), Canadian horse-racing track owner, casino operator, (cousin of William Orpen)
Arthur Orpen Herbert (1831–1890), railway commissioner
Bea Orpen (1913–1980), Irish painter
Charles Orpen (1791–1856), Irish physician, writer and clergyman
Edward Richards-Orpen (1884–1967), Irish politician
Francis Orpen Morris, (1810–1893), Irish clergyman
John Orpen (1868–1950), Anglican clergyman
Joseph Orpen (1828–1923), British colonial administrator
Goddard Henry Orpen (1852–1932), Irish historian
Raymond Orpen (1837–1930), Irish clergyman 
William Orpen (1871–1931), Irish portrait painter

English-language surnames
Surnames of Norman origin
Anglo-Norman families
Normans in Ireland